Fireblade may refer to:

Honda Fireblade, a family of sport motorcycles
Fireblade (Company), a website security and traffic management software company
Fire Blade (video game), a flight simulation video game
Fireblade, a fire spell in the online game of Wizard101